Liyongo Patrise Alexander (born October 23, 1972) is a former American football linebacker in the National Football League (NFL) for the Washington Redskins. He played college football at the University of Southwestern Louisiana.

External links
Orlando Rage Bio

1972 births
Living people
American football linebackers
People from Galveston, Texas
Louisiana Ragin' Cajuns football players
Washington Redskins players
Orlando Rage players
Dallas Desperados players
Austin Wranglers players